George Clements (born 1932) is an American Roman Catholic priest and social activist.

George Clements may also refer to:
 
 George H. Clements (newspaper manager), newspaper manager in Texas
 Nick Clements (George Nick Clements, 1940–2009), American theoretical linguist